Reggina Calcio was thought to be a prime candidate to be relegated in the 2006-07 season, since it had been deducted eleven points for its involvement in Calciopoli. At no stage had Reggina renewed its contract with more than a point or two, and therefore its 51 points in 38 games was a very high yield. The Serie A stay was extended thanks to the successful striking force of Rolando Bianchi and Nicola Amoruso, scoring an unprecedented 35 goals between them. Bianchi headed for Manchester City in the summer, and successful coach Walter Mazzarri found a new berth at Sampdoria.

Squad

Goalkeepers
  Ivan Pelizzoli (until January)
  Pietro Marino
  Nenad Novaković
  Andrea Campagnolo
  Christian Puggioni

Defenders
  Antonio Giosa
  Palmiro Di Dio
  Salvatore Aronica
  Alessandro Lucarelli
  Antonino Barillà
  Francesco Modesto
  Maurizio Lanzaro

Midfielders
  Riccardo Nardini
  Giovanni Morabito
  Ricardo Esteves
  Luca Tognozzi
  Leonel Ríos
  Alessandro Gazzi
  Daniele Amerini
  Giacomo Tedesco
  Giandomenico Mesto
  Ivan Castiglia
  Filippo Carobbio
  Luca Vigiani
  Simone Missiroli
  Pasquale Porcaro
  Julio León

Attackers
  Rolando Bianchi
  Nicola Amoruso
  Pasquale Foggia
  Nicki Bille Nielsen
  Henry Shiba

Serie A

Matches
 Palermo-Reggina 4-3
 1-0 Mark Bresciano (11)
 2-0 Giuseppe Biava (17)
 3-0 Eugenio Corini (27 pen)
 3-1 Rolando Bianchi (42)
 3-2 Rolando Bianchi (55)
 4-2 Amauri (67)
 4-3 Rolando Bianchi (78 pen)
 Reggina-Cagliari 2-1
 1-0 Alessandro Lucarelli (52)
 1-1 David Suazo (62 pen)
 2-1 Rolando Bianchi (90 + 3)
 Messina-Reggina 2-0
 1-0 Christian Riganò (25)
 2-0 Christian Riganò (85)
 Reggina-Torino 1-1
 1-0 Francesco Modesto (56)
 1-1 Gianluca Comotto (65)
 Atalanta-Reggina 1-1
 1-0 Simone Loria (3)
 1-1 Giacomo Tedesco (6)
 Reggina-Roma 1-0
 1-0 Nicola Amoruso (49)
 Fiorentina-Reggina 3-0
 1-0 Adrian Mutu (31)
 2-0 Mario Santana (43)
 3-0 Manuele Blasi (55)
 Reggina-Parma 3-2
 1-0 Nicola Amoruso (33)
 1-1 Igor Budan (39)
 2-1 Rolando Bianchi (76)
 3-1 Nicola Amoruso (78)
 3-2 Andrea Gasbarroni (85)
 Lazio-Reggina 0-0
 Reggina-Catania 0-1
 0-1 Giorgio Corona (69)
 Siena-Reggina 0-1
 0-1 Rolando Bianchi (71 pen)
 Inter-Reggina 1-0
 1-0 Hernán Crespo (4)
 Reggina-Livorno 2-2
 0-1 Fabio Galante (22)
 0-2 Cristiano Lucarelli (27)
 1-2 Rolando Bianchi (66)
 2-2 Julio León (78)
 Udinese-Reggina 1-1
 0-1 Rolando Bianchi (35)
 1-1 Vincenzo Iaquinta (69)
 Reggina-Ascoli 2-1
 1-0 Alessandro Lucarelli (29)
 2-0 Nicola Amoruso (78)
 2-1 Marco Pecorari (84)
 Reggina-Sampdoria 0-1
 0-1 Fabio Quagliarella (68)
 Chievo-Reggina 3-2
 0-1 Nicola Amoruso (17)
 1-1 Paolo Sammarco (27)
 2-1 Federico Cossato (44)
 2-2 Francesco Modesto (78)
 3-2 Simone Tiribocchi (88)
 Reggina-Empoli 4-1
 1-0 Julio León (4)
 2-0 Nicola Amoruso (8)
 3-0 Nicola Amoruso (27)
 4-0 Rolando Bianchi (43)
 4-1 Luca Saudati (67)
 Milan-Reggina 3-1
 1-0 Andrea Pirlo (6)
 2-0 Clarence Seedorf (35)
 2-1 Rolando Bianchi (67)
 3-1 Alberto Gilardino (78)
 Reggina-Palermo 0-0
 Cagliari-Reggina 0-2
 0-1 Luca Vigiani (47)
 0-2 Luca Vigiani (58)
 Torino-Reggina 1-2
 0-1 Rolando Bianchi (48)
 1-1 Gianluca Comotto (49)
 1-2 Rolando Bianchi (58)
 Reggina-Atalanta 1-1
 1-0 Nicola Amoruso (64)
 1-1 Maurizio Lanzaro (75 og)
 Roma-Reggina 3-0
 1-0 Francesco Tavano (55)
 2-0 Philippe Mexès (65)
 3-0 Christian Panucci (90)
 Reggina-Fiorentina 1-1
 1-0 Pasquale Foggia (57)
 1-1 Adrian Mutu (87 pen)
 Parma-Reggina 2-2
 0-1 Rolando Bianchi (14)
 1-1 Igor Budan (23)
 1-2 Rolando Bianchi (40)
 2-2 Giuseppe Rossi (90 + 7 pen)
 Reggina-Lazio 2-3
 1-0 Giacomo Tedesco (26)
 1-1 Christian Manfredini (45)
 1-2 Goran Pandev (45 + 1)
 2-2 Pasquale Foggia (65)
 2-3 Stephen Makinwa (79)
 Catania-Reggina 1-4
 0-1 Nicola Amoruso (57)
 0-2 Pasquale Foggia (62)
 0-3 Rolando Bianchi (85 pen)
 0-4 Ricardo Esteves (88)
 1-4 Fausto Rossini (90)
 Reggina-Siena 0-1
 0-1 Valerio Bertotto (45 + 1)
 Reggina-Inter 0-0
 Livorno-Reggina 1-1
 1-0 Cristiano Lucarelli (28)
 1-1 Rolando Bianchi (31)
 Reggina-Messina 3-1
 1-0 Rolando Bianchi (13)
 1-1 Christian Riganò (27 pen)
 2-1 Nicola Amoruso (54)
 3-1 Nicola Amoruso (72 pen)
 Reggina-Udinese 1-1
 0-1 Sulley Muntari (26)
 1-1 Nicola Amoruso (84 pen)
 Ascoli-Reggina 2-3
 1-0 Michele Fini (14)
 1-1 Nicola Amoruso (24)
 1-2 Nicola Amoruso (32)
 1-3 Pasquale Foggia (54)
 2-3 Massimo Bonanni (82)
 Sampdoria-Reggina 0-0
 Reggina-Chievo 1-1
 0-1 Matteo Brighi (51)
 1-1 Rolando Bianchi (53)
 Empoli-Reggina 3-3
 1-0 Ighli Vannucchi (9)
 2-0 Fabio Moro (22)
 3-0 Luca Saudati (23)
 3-1 Luca Vigiani (52)
 3-2 Nicola Amoruso (56)
 3-3 Nicola Amoruso (84 pen)
 Reggina-Milan 2-0
 1-0 Nicola Amoruso (8)
 2-0 Daniele Amerini (67)

Topscorers
  Rolando Bianchi 18
  Nicola Amoruso 17
  Pasquale Foggia 4
  Francesco Modesto 3
  Luca Vigiani 3

Sources
  RSSSF - Italy 2006/07

Reggina 1914 seasons
Reggina